Azad is a town of Farah Province in western Afghanistan near to the border with Iran. It is located at 32°38'5N 61°32'28E with an altitude of 724 metres (2378 feet).

References

Populated places in Farah Province